The 2021 Montevideo Open was a professional tennis tournament played on red clay courts in Montevideo. It was the first edition for the women that was also part of the 2021 WTA 125K series. It took place at the Carrasco Lawn Tennis Club in Montevideo, Uruguay between November 8 and 21, 2021. The 2020 edition could not take place due to the COVID-19 pandemic.

Singles main-draw entrants

Seeds

 Rankings are as of November 8, 2021.

Other entrants
The following players received wildcards into the singles main draw:
  Guillermina Grant
  Ane Mintegi del Olmo

The following players received entry from the qualifying draw:
  Marina Bulbarella
  Martina Capurro Taborda
  Dasha Ivanova
  Olivia Tjandramulia

Withdrawals
Before the tournament
  Gabriela Cé → replaced by  Carolina Alves
  Grace Min → replaced by  Ana Sofía Sánchez
  Tereza Mrdeža → replaced by  Laura Pigossi
  Daniela Seguel → replaced by  Carol Zhao
  Mayar Sherif → replaced by  Marina Bassols Ribera
  Anastasia Tikhonova → replaced by  Elina Avanesyan
  Renata Zarazúa → replaced by  Anna Sisková
  Zhang Shuai → replaced by  Bárbara Gatica

Doubles main-draw entrants

Seeds

 Rankings are as of November 8, 2021

Other entrants
The following pairs received wildcards into the doubles main draw: 
  Guillermina Grant /  Juliana Rodríguez

Champions

Singles

  Diane Parry def.  Panna Udvardy, 6–3, 6–2

Doubles

  Irina Bara /  Ekaterine Gorgodze  def.  Carolina Alves /  Marina Bassols Ribera 6–4, 6–3

External links
 Official website

References

2021 WTA 125 tournaments
2021 in Uruguayan sport
November 2021 sports events in South America